Colin Edward George Hebbard (born 10 November 1936) was an Australian rules footballer who played for Essendon in the VFL.

Hebbard, a West Australian, was recruited to Essendon as number 4, from Perth club Mount Hawthorn. He shared his VFL debut with future star John Birt and participated in both Essendon's losing Grand Finals of 1957 and 1959. Over the course of his five seasons he played mostly as a half forward and half back.

After leaving Essendon he turned to the WANFL and began playing at West Perth. He made a total of 93 senior appearances for the club, some beside his brothers Neville and Robert. During the 1960s he represented Western Australia in six interstate matches, four of them in the 1966 Hobart Carnival.

References

Holmesby, Russell and Main, Jim (2007). The Encyclopedia of AFL Footballers. 7th ed. Melbourne: Bas Publishing.

1936 births
Living people
Essendon Football Club players
West Perth Football Club players
Australian rules footballers from Western Australia